Nikolay Georgievich Rasheyev (Russian: Рашéев Николáй Геóргиевич; 8 April 1935 – 5 October 2021) was a Soviet and Ukrainian film director and screenwriter.

Biography
Rasheyev was born in Kyiv, Ukraine. His father was a Bulgarian political émigré, who was arrested in 1937. He graduated from the Kyiv Polytechnic Institute in 1957 and enrolled in Gerasimov Institute of Cinematography, from which he was expelled during the campaign against Boris Pasternak's novel Dr. Zhivago. Pasternak was persecuted by the Soviet government until his death and was forced to decline the Nobel Prize. Nikolay Rasheyev, like many of his contemporaries, was expelled from the university after being accused of being "a spiritual brother of Pasternak". He finished his studies at Gerasimov Institute of Cinematography by correspondence. In 1966 he completed advanced coursework in screenwriting and directing.

After being expelled from the Gerasimov Institute, he made use of his earlier engineering education, working in various jobs in northern and eastern Russia, in Tuva, Sakhalin and Chukotka.

In 1964, he graduated from Gerasimov Institute of Cinematography (scriptwriting faculty) and in 1966, the Higher Courses of Scriptwriters and directors.

He worked as an assistant director for TV stations in Chişinău and Kiev and as a director for Perm television and the Moldova-Film studios. He became a director in Dovzhenko Film Studios in 1971. Among his most popular works are Bumbarash and Kings and Cabbage, an adaptation of O. Henry's book of the same name.

Filmography
 2008 Film about the movie (documentary) / Фильм о фильме (документальный)
 2008. An almost unbelievable history / Бумбараш. Почти невероятная история
 2010 My truth (Ukraine, documentary) / Моя правда (Украина, документальный)
 2010 The Valeriy Zolotukhin´s damnation / Проклятие Валерия Золотухина

Director

 1964 An Incident at Krechetovka Station (short) / Случай на станции Кречетовка (короткометражный)
 1965 The Fog (short) / Туман (короткометражный)
 1968 A small school orchestra / Маленький школьный оркестр
 1971 Bumbarash / Бумбараш
 1973  Hare´s reserve/Заячий заповедник
 1976 The theatre of an unknown actor / Театр неизвестного актера
 1978 Cabbages and kings/ Короли и капуста
 1981 Apple on the palm / Яблоко на ладони
 1984 Make a clown laugh / Рассмешите клоуна
 1988 Love one's neighbour / Любовь к ближнему
 1991 Talisman / Оберег

Screenwriter
 1967 Vertical (dir. Stanislav Govorukhin) / Вертикаль:
 1968 A small school orchestra / Маленький школьный оркестр
 1976 The theatre of an unknown actor / Театр неизвестного актера
 1991 Talisman / Оберег

Awards
 Meritorious Worker of Arts Ukraine (2000).
 Award for leadership in the Tashkent Film Festival for the film Bumbarash.

External links
 
 Интервью журналу «Киноведческие записки»
 Интервью в журнале «Зеркало недели» №15, 17 апреля 2010
 Интервью журналу «Еженедельник 2000»
 Н. Рашеев. История одного интервью.
 Статья «Комедия в советском кино»

Soviet film directors
Ukrainian film directors
1935 births
2021 deaths
Film people from Kyiv
Ukrainian people of Bulgarian descent
High Courses for Scriptwriters and Film Directors alumni
Soviet people of Bulgarian descent